Booklist Editors Choice is an annual list compiled and reviewed by Booklist's editorial staff as the best adult and youth books and videos, and audiobooks. Booklist is a publication "that has been published by the American Library Association for more than 100 years, and is widely viewed as offering the most reliable reviews to help libraries decide what to buy and to help library patrons and students decide what to read, view, or listen to." The list is separated into nine categories: adult and youth fiction, adult and youth nonfiction, youth picture book, adult and youth graphic novels, and adult and youth audiobooks.

Recipients

References

American literary awards
Literary awards by magazines and newspapers
Lists of books
English-language literary awards